Kristian Hansen may refer to:

Kristian Hansen (gymnast) (1895–1955), Danish gymnast
Kristian Hansen (handballer), Norwegian handball player

See also 
Christian Hansen (disambiguation)